CHIP (Constraint Handling in Prolog) is a constraint logic programming language developed by M. Dincbas, Pascal Van Hentenryck and colleagues in 1985 at the European Computer-Industry Research Centre (ECRC), initially using a Prolog language interface.
It was the first programming language to implement Constraint Programming over Finite Domains,

and subsequently to introduce the concept of Global Constraints.

CHIP V5 is the version developed and marketed by COSYTEC in Paris since 1993 with Prolog, using C, C++, or Prolog language interfaces. The commercially successful ILOG Solver is also, partly, an offshoot of ECRC version of CHIP.

References

External links
 CHIP - History of Programming Languages (archived version)

Logic programming languages
Constraint logic programming